LXO may refer to:

 LXO-103 and LXO-104, two CompTIA exams
 LXO, abbreviation for the Legion Executive Officer of the 501st Legion
 LXO, Luxology Modo file format
 LXO airline code of Luxor Air